Matteo Piccione (1615 - 1671) was an Italian painter, active in Rome, as a painter of religious subjects. He was born in Ancona. He is noted by Lanzi to be a collaborator with Giovanni Antonio Galli He was an academic in the Accademia di San Luca in 1655. One of his paintings is in San Martino ai Monti, Rome. Mariette's catalogue lists paintings in the style of Veronese and Cesi.

References

1615 births
1671 deaths
People from Ancona
Italian Baroque painters
17th-century Italian painters
Italian male painters